ZTR Zaporizhzhia  is a team handball club from Zaporizhzhia, Ukraine. Currently, ZTR Zaporizhzhia competes in the Ukrainian Men's Handball Super League. The club was before called ZYY and ZeMtY.

The club is renamed ZTR Zaporizhzhia in 1992.

The Club's history
Handball Club ZTR (before called ZYY and ZeMtY) was established in 1966 on the basis of Zaporizhzhia branch of Dnipropetrovsk metallurgy institute. In 1992 Zaporizhzhia Transformer Plant (Zaporozhtransformator) has become a sponsor of the club, which was renamed to "ZTR".

Accomplishments
EHF Cup: 1
Winner: 1983
Finalist: 1985
Ukrainian Men's Handball Super League 14
Champion: 1993, 1995, 1998, 1999, 2000, 2001, 2003, 2004, 2005, 2007, 2008, 2009, 2010, 2011
Runner-up (9) : 1996, 1997, 2002, 2006, 2013, 2015, 2016, 2017, 2018
Ukrainian Handball Cup: 2
Winner: 2001, 2011
Soviet Men's Handball Championship
Runner-up : 1971

European record

Notable players
Serhiy Kushniryuk
Oleksandr Rezanov
Mykhaylo Ishchenko
Yuriy Lahutyn
Mykola Tomyn
 Vitaliy Nat
  Sergiy Onufriyenko (–2009)
 Evgeny Budko
 Sergii Burka
 Yuriy Petrenko
 Sergey Shelmenko

External links
Official site

Ukrainian handball clubs
Sport in Zaporizhzhia